CKNN-FM, branded as Nuxalk Radio, is a non-commercial community radio station broadcasting from the Nuxalk village of Q'umk'uts' in Bella Coola, British Columbia. It was founded 21 June 2014 and broadcasts on 91.1 FM and online. The Alkw Media Society administers Nuxalk Radio with a board of directors from the Nuxalk and Bella Coola community.

References

External links
 Nuxalk Radio
 Nuxalk Radio interview with BC Musician Magazine

Knn